Badminton at the 2017 ASEAN Para Games was held at Axiata Arena, Kuala Lumpur.

Classification

Players were classified to six different classes as per determined by Badminton World Federation.

Medal tally

Medalists

Men

Women

Mixed

See also
Badminton at the 2017 Southeast Asian Games

External links
 Badminton at Games Result system

2017 ASEAN Para Games
Badminton at the ASEAN Para Games
ASEAN Para Games
Badminton in Malaysia